A medicine chest is a container or cabinet for storing medicine.  All ships governed by the regulations of the International Maritime Organization must have medical supplies and suitable storage for them such as refrigeration and locks.

In Canada medicine chest has a related, symbolic meaning. Under the terms of Treaty 6 between the Canadian government and several bands of First Nations people ("Indians"), the government was required to supply each Indian reserve with a medicine chest. Thst has been interpreted as an ongoing responsibility for the government to provide healthcare to First Nations people.

References

Pharmacy
Political terminology in Canada